Silversun is a science fiction children's television series made in Australia by the Australian Broadcasting Corporation (ABC). The show features the adventures of the adolescent members of the crew of the Star Runner, an interstellar spaceship carrying a cargo of 550 cryonically suspended colonists ("") to their new home, the Silver Sun.

In the year 2052, the Star Runner and its crew are two years into their 90-year journey to a livable planet 45 light years from Earth. The crew's goal is to get the "New Settlers" safely to the Silver Sun and begin a colony there. Because of the 90-year-length of the journey, the crew are mostly teenagers who will take over command of the Star Runner as the adults get older.

Cast

Main cast
 Thomas Blackburne as Tane Wilson: A skilled cadet pilot.
 Cleopatra Coleman as Zandie Brokow: A strong-minded, often outspoken ex-cryon crew member of the Star Runner.
 Ryan Corr as Sheng Zammett: A brilliantly minded cadet scientist.
 Karli Dinardo as Cinnamon Everson: Steve and Karen's young daughter.
 Cherise Donovan as Leonella Reiss: A cadet medical officer. Daughter of Lillian.
 Eloise Mignon as Mara Lomax: A cadet medical officer aspiring towards leadership.
 Orpheus Pledger as Tycho Everson: Steve and Karen's young son.
 Sarah Walker as Pancha McCaskill: Cadet computer officer of the Star Runner. Her brain implant gives her a telepathic link to the ship's computer systems.
 Michelle Pettigrove as Doctor Lillian Reiss: Star Runners chief medical officer, Cyriax's second-in-command and occasionally overprotective mother of Leonella.
 Teague Rook as Steve Everson: Star Runners stern engineer, husband of Karen and father of Cinnamon and Tycho.
 Yesse Spence as Karen Everson: Star Runners astronomer and navigator, wife of Steve and mother of Cinnamon and Tycho.
 Jeremy Stanford as Commander Aaron 'Skipper' Cyriax: Commanding officer of the Star Runner.

Additionally, Jeremy Stanford portrays an illusion of himself from an alien virus, and his clone, known as "C2" or "Will Power".

Guest cast
In order of appearance:
 Joan Murray as Eileen Lomax: Mara's grandmother back on earth. (3 episodes)
 Nathan Vernon as Jarrax Wells: Leonella's ex-boyfriend back on Earth. (1 episode)
 Don Halbert as Interviewer (1 episode, uncredited)
 Tracy Mann as Holophone voice over (2 episodes, credited in 1)
 Victoria Eagger as Commodore Sorenson: A leading figure of the Silver Sun Fleet at Star Command. (1 episode)
 Adrian Mulraney as Commander John Darius: Commanding officer of the Infinity. (2 episodes)
 Michael Harrison as Julian Strega: A highly intelligent cadet pilot serving on board the Infinity. (4 episodes)
 Anthony Mays as Strega stunt double (1 episode)

Production
The ABC began showing Silversun on 11 October 2004 at 5:00 pm daily as part of its children's lineup. The final episode was broadcast on 3 December 2004. Forty episodes of the program were produced, each at twenty-two minutes. The program was originally aired on the Seven Network in two groups of twenty episodes, and then shown again without a mid-way break on the ABC.

Silversun was re-run on Sunday mornings beginning 3 April 2005, until 1 January 2006. It was rerun again in 2009 each weekday at 5:00 pm, finishing on 17 September 2009. The ABC has no plans to create a second season of the program.

Many episodes revolved around the relationships and issues experienced by the young crew as part of adolescence. Some episodes dealt with issues of ethics and choices unique to science fiction, such as the question of whether the commander's clone should be treated as human or not, the unique human problems encountered by a crew on a lifelong voyage to the stars, and an encounter with a pulsar whose pulse cycle is in phase with the brainwaves of the crewmember Pancha, to her detriment.

Although some first-season episodes are self-contained, the majority deal with multi-episode plot conflicts occurring on board the Star Runner. These included the illegal re-animation of the character Zandie by the rogue crewmember Degenhardt in the earlier episodes, the crew's encounter with a wormhole, the infection of Commander Cyriax by an alien parasite, his subsequent cure through the use of a harvest clone of him discovered in suspension among the settler pods, and the clone's accidental awakening to full consciousness. The final episode ended in a cliffhanger.

Episodes

Season 1

Season 2

See also

 List of Australian television series

References

External links
 Official website (archived)
 
 Silversun on TV.com

Australian Broadcasting Corporation original programming
Australian adventure television series
Australian children's television series
Australian science fiction television series
2004 Australian television series debuts
2004 Australian television series endings
Television series about teenagers
Television series by Beyond Television Productions